The 2019 Benin protests was a widespread popular uprising and post-election conflict after the opposition was barred from running in the 2019 Beninese parliamentary election in Benin.

Background
Pre-elections (February–April), demonstrators called for the scrap of a new electoral law, however, a violent crackdown quashed the protests easily. On 1 May, the results of the elections was announced, leading to small protests and rallies in Cotonou that evening.

Protests
Tensions simmered when protests turned into riots after demonstrators came in their tens of thousands nationwide, throwing stones at tanks and the armed forces, who responded with Rubber bullets, Water cannon and Live ammunition in Cotonou, Porto-Novo and Parakou, the three largest cities. 2 were killed over the next 10 days of violent protests. After the president Patrice Talon condemned protesters and the popular uprising, saying it will plunge the country into war, thousands took to the streets in June, the result, Police opened fire wounding several.

Due to the lack of safety during demonstrations, protesters marches ended without notice.

Gallery

See also
 2019 Gabonese protests

References

2019 protests
Protests against results of elections
2019 in Benin
Protests in Benin